Rasiliverpa is a genus of parasitic flies in the family Tachinidae.

Species
Rasiliverpa agrianomei (Mesnil1, 1968)
Rasiliverpa vicinella (Mesnil1, 1968)

References

Dexiinae
Diptera of Australasia
Tachinidae genera